Magnetic particle imaging (MPI) is an emerging non-invasive tomographic technique that directly detects superparamagnetic nanoparticle tracers. The technology has potential applications in diagnostic imaging and material science.  Currently, it is used in medical research to measure the 3-D location and concentration of nanoparticles. Imaging does not use ionizing radiation and can produce a signal at any depth within the body. MPI was first conceived in 2001 by scientists working at the Royal Philips Research lab in Hamburg. The first system was established and reported in 2005.  Since then, the technology has been advanced by academic researchers at several universities around the world. The first commercial MPI scanners have recently become available from Magnetic Insight and Bruker Biospin.

The hardware used for MPI is very different from MRI. MPI systems use changing magnetic fields to generate a signal from superparamagnetic iron oxide (SPIO) nanoparticles. These fields are specifically designed to produce a single magnetic field free region. A signal is only generated in this region. An image is generated by moving this region across a sample. Since there is no natural SPIO in tissue, a signal is only detected from the administered tracer.  This provides images without background. MPI is often used in combination with anatomical imaging techniques (such as CT or MRI) providing information on the location of the tracer.

Applications 
Magnetic particle imaging combines high tracer sensitivity with submillimeter resolution. Imaging is performed in a range of milliseconds to seconds. The iron oxide tracer used with MPI are cleared naturally by the body through the mononuclear phagocyte system.  The iron oxide nanoparticles are broken down in the liver, where the iron is stored and used to produce hemoglobin.  SPIOs have previously been used in humans for iron supplementation and liver imaging.

Blood pool imaging

Cardiovascular 

The first in vivo MPI results provided images of a beating mouse heart in 2009. With further research, this could eventually be used for real-time cardiac imaging.

Oncology 

MPI has numerous applications to the field of oncology research. Accumulation of a tracer within solid tumors can occur through the enhanced permeability and retention effect.  This has been successfully used to detect tumor sites within rats.  The high sensitivity of the technique means it may also be possible to image micro-metastasis through the development of nanoparticles targeted to cancer cells.  MPI is being investigated as a clinical alternative screening technique to nuclear medicine in order to reduce radiation exposure in at-risk populations.

Cell tracking 
By tagging therapeutic cells with iron oxide nanoparticles, MPI allows them to be tracked throughout the body.  This has applications in regenerative medicine and cancer immunotherapy.  Imaging can be used to improve the success of stem cell therapy by following the movement of these cells in the body. The tracer is stable while tagged to a cell and remains detectable past 87 days.

Functional brain imaging 
MPI has been proposed as a promising platform for functional brain imaging that requires highly sensitive imaging as well as short scan times for sufficient temporal resolution. For this, MPI is used to detect the increase of cerebral blood volume (CBV) arising from neuroactivation. Functional neuroimaging using MPI has been successfully demonstrated in rodents and has a promising sensitivity advantage compared to other imaging modalities. In the long perspective, this could potentially allow to study functional neuroactivation on a single-patient level and thus bring functional neuroimaging to clinical diagnostics.

Superparamagnetic tracer 
The tracers used in magnetic particle imaging (MPI) are superparamagnetic iron oxide nanoparticles (SPIONs). They are composed of a magnetite (Fe3O4) or maghemite (Fe2O3) core surrounded by a surface coating (commonly dextran, carboxydextran, or polyethylene glycol).

The SPION tracer is detectable within biological fluids, such as the blood.  This fluid is very responsive to even weak magnetic fields, and all of the magnetic moments will line up in the direction of an induced magnetic field.  These particles can be used because the human body does not contain anything which will create magnetic interference in imaging.
As the sole tracer, the properties of SPIONs are of key importance to the signal intensity and resolution of MPI. Iron oxide nanoparticles, due to their magnetic dipoles, exhibit a spontaneous magnetization that can be controlled by an applied magnetic field. Therefore, the performance of SPIONs in MPI is critically dependent on their magnetic properties, such as saturation magnetization, magnetic diameter, and relaxation mechanism. Upon application of an external magnetic field, the relaxation of SPIONs can be governed by two mechanisms, Néel, and Brownian relaxation. When the entire particle rotates with respect to the environment, it is following Brownian relaxation, which is affected by the physical diameter. When only the magnetic dipole rotates within the particles, the mechanism is called Néel relaxation, which is affected by the magnetic diameter. According to the Langevin model of superparamagnetism, the spatial resolution of MPI should improve cubically with the magnetics diameter, which can be obtained by fitting magnetization versus magnetic field curve to a Langevin model. However, more recent calculations suggest that there exists an optimal SPIONs magnetic size range (~26 nm) for MPI. This is because of blurring caused by Brownian relaxation of large magnetics size SPIONs. Although magnetic size critically affects the MPI performance, it is often poorly analyzed in publications reporting applications of MPI using SPIONs. Often, commercially available tracers or home-made tracers are used without thorough magnetic characterization. Importantly, due to spin canting and disorder at the surface, or due to the formation of mixed-phase nanoparticles, the equivalent magnetic diameter can be smaller than the physical diameter. And magnetic diameter is critical because of the response of particles to an applied magnetic field dependent on the magnetic diameter, not physical diameter. The largest equivalent magnetic diameter can be the same as the physical diameter. A recent review paper by Chandrasekharan et al. summarizes properties of various iron oxide contrast agents and their MPI performance measured using their in-house Magnetic Particle Spectrometer, shown in the picture here. It should be pointed out that the core diameter listed in the table is not necessarily the magnetic diameter. The table provides a comparison of all current published SPIONs for MPI contrast agents. As seen in the table, LS017, with a SPION core size of 28.7 nm and synthesized through heating up thermal decomposition with post-synthesis oxidation, has the best resolution compared with others with lower core size.
Resovist (Ferucarbotran), consisting of iron oxide made via coprecipitation, is the most commonly used and commercially available tracer. However, as suggested by Gleich et al., only 3% of the total iron mass from Resovist contributes to the MPI signal due to its polydispersity, leading to relatively low MPI sensitivity. The signal intensity of MPI is influenced by both the magnetic core diameter and the size distribution of SPIONs. Comparing the MPI sensitivity listed in the above table, LS017 has the highest signal intensity (54.57 V/g of Fe) as particles are monodisperse and possess a large magnetic diameter compared with others.

The surface coating also plays a key role in determining the behavior of the SPIONs. It minimizes unwanted interactions between the iron oxide cores (for example, counteracting attractive forces between the particles to prevent aggregation), increases stability and compatibility with the biological environment, and can also be used to tailor SPION performance to particular imaging applications. Different coatings cause changes in cellular uptake, blood circulation, and interactions with the immune system, influencing how the tracer becomes distributed throughout the body over time. For example, SPIONs coated with carboxydextran have been shown to clear to the liver almost immediately after injection, while those with a polyethylene glycol (PEG) coating remain in circulation for hours before being cleared from the blood. These behaviors make the carboxydextran-coated SPION tracer better optimized for liver imaging and the PEG-coated SPION tracer more suitable for vascular imaging.

Advantages 
High resolution (~0.4 mm)
Fast image results (~20 ms)
No radiation
No iodine
No background noise (high contrast)

Signal enhancement

Passive dual coil resonator 
A device that provides frequency-selective signal enhancement was recently developed at RWTH Aachen University. The passive dual coil resonator (pDCR) is a purely passive receive coil insert for a preclinical MPI system. The pDCR aims to enhance the frequency components associated with high mixing orders, which are critical to achieve a high spatial resolution.

Congresses, workshops 
 WMIS MPI Interest Group Meeting
 Homepage of the Annual International Workshop on MPI

References

Further reading 
 First in vivo magnetic particle imaging of lung perfusion in rats. Zhou XY, Jeffris K, Yu E, Zheng B, Goodwill P, Nahid P, Conolly S. Phys Med Biol. 2017 Feb 20.
 Tracking short-term biodistribution and long-term clearance of SPIO tracers in magnetic particle imaging. Keselman P, Yu E, Zhou X, Goodwill P, Chandrasekharan P, Ferguson RM, Khandhar A, Kemp S, Krishnan K, Zheng B, Conolly S. Phys Med Biol. 2017 Feb 8
 Evaluation of PEG-coated iron oxide nanoparticles as blood pool tracers for preclinical magnetic particle imaging. Khandhar AP, Keselman P, Kemp SJ, Ferguson RM, Goodwill PW, Conolly SM, Krishnan KM. Nanoscale. 2017 Jan 19;9(3):1299-1306.
 Combining magnetic particle imaging and magnetic fluid hyperthermia in a theranostic platform. Hensley DW, Tay ZW, Dhavalikar R, Zheng B, Goodwill P, Rinaldi C, Conolly S. Phys Med Biol. 2016 Dec 29.
 Finite magnetic relaxation in x-space magnetic particle imaging: Comparison of measurements and ferrohydrodynamic models. Dhavalikar R, Hensley D, Maldonado-Camargo L, Croft LR, Ceron S, Goodwill PW, Conolly SM, Rinaldi C. J Phys D Appl Phys. 2016 Aug 3;49(30)
 A High-Throughput, Arbitrary-Waveform, MPI Spectrometer and Relaxometer for Comprehensive Magnetic Particle Optimization and Characterization. Tay ZW, Goodwill PW, Hensley DW, Taylor LA, Zheng B, Conolly SM. Sci Rep. 2016 Sep 30;6:34180.
 Eddy current-shielded x-space relaxometer for sensitive magnetic nanoparticle characterization. Bauer LM, Hensley DW, Zheng B, Tay ZW, Goodwill PW, Griswold MA, Conolly SM. Rev Sci Instrum. 2016 May;87(5):055109.
 Low drive field amplitude for improved image resolution in magnetic particle imaging. Croft LR, Goodwill PW, Konkle JJ, Arami H, Price DA, Li AX, Saritas EU, Conolly SM. Med Phys. 2016 Jan;43(1):424. doi: 10.1118/1.4938097.
 A Convex Formulation for Magnetic Particle Imaging X-Space Reconstruction. Konkle JJ, Goodwill PW, Hensley DW, Orendorff RD, Lustig M, Conolly SM. PLoS One. 2015 Oct 23;10(10):e0140137. doi: 10.1371/journal.pone.0140137.
 Effects of pulse duration on magnetostimulation thresholds.Saritas EU, Goodwill PW, Conolly SM. Med Phys. 2015 Jun;42(6):3005-12. doi: 10.1118/1.4921209.
 In vivo multimodal magnetic particle imaging (MPI) with tailored magneto/optical contrast agents. Arami H, Khandhar AP, Tomitaka A, Yu E, Goodwill PW, Conolly SM, Krishnan KM. Biomaterials. 2015 Jun;52:251-61. doi: 10.1016/j.biomaterials.2015.02.040.
 Magnetic particle imaging with tailored iron oxide nanoparticle tracers. Ferguson RM, Khandhar AP, Kemp SJ, Arami H, Saritas EU, Croft LR, Konkle J, Goodwill PW, Halkola A, Rahmer J, Borgert J, Conolly SM, Krishnan KM. IEEE Trans Med Imaging. 2015 May;34(5):1077-84. doi: 10.1109/TMI.2014.2375065.
 Twenty-fold acceleration of 3D projection reconstruction MPI. Konkle JJ, Goodwill PW, Saritas EU, Zheng B, Lu K, Conolly SM. Biomed Tech (Berl). 2013 Dec;58(6):565-76. doi: 10.1515/bmt-2012-0062.
 Magnetostimulation limits in magnetic particle imaging. Saritas EU, Goodwill PW, Zhang GZ, Conolly SM. IEEE Trans Med Imaging. 2013 Sep;32(9):1600-10. doi: 10.1109/TMI.2013.2260764..
 Linearity and shift invariance for quantitative magnetic particle imaging. Lu K, Goodwill PW, Saritas EU, Zheng B, Conolly SM. IEEE Trans Med Imaging. 2013 Sep;32(9):1565-75. doi: 10.1109/TMI.2013.2257177.
 Magnetic particle imaging (MPI) for NMR and MRI researchers. Saritas EU, Goodwill PW, Croft LR, Konkle JJ, Lu K, Zheng B, Conolly SM. J Magn Reson. 2013 Apr;229:116-26. doi: 10.1016/j.jmr.2012.11.029. Review.
 Projection reconstruction magnetic particle imaging. Konkle JJ, Goodwill PW, Carrasco-Zevallos OM, Conolly SM. IEEE Trans Med Imaging. 2013 Feb;32(2):338-47. doi: 10.1109/TMI.2012.2227121.

External links 
Magnetic Insight, Inc.  - Commercializing MPI technology originally developed at the University of California, Berkeley 11/2014 
Understanding Magnetic Particle Imaging 
The MOMENTUM Magnetic Particle Imaging System 
J.-P. Gehrcke. Characterization of the Magnetic Particle Imaging Signal Based on Theory, Simulation, and Experiment. M. Sc. thesis, University of Würzburg, 2010.
Magnetic particle imaging: moving ahead, medicalphysicsweb.org Apr 12, 2011
"Traveling Wave MPI at University of Würzburg"
"Magnetic Particle Imaging (MPI) at RWTH Aachen University"
 "MPI work at University of California, Berkeley"
 "MPI research at University of Lübeck"
 "Philips announces breakthrough in medical imaging technology"
 What you see is what you've got
 Breaking New Ground in Molecular Imaging
 Flipping Good Imaging. Radiology Today May 2017

Imaging